Pašková is a village and municipality in the Rožňava District in the Košice Region of middle-eastern Slovakia.
The Hungarian name is Páskaháza.

History
In historical records the village was first mentioned in 1318.

Geography
The village lies at an altitude of 237 metres and covers an area of 6.007 km².

The village is situated in a valley oriented from north to south. The eastern mountain chain has its local peak near the village called Nagyhegy, or "Big Hill."

A river flows through it, called Sajo (in Hungarian).

Population
It has a population of about 290 people. Most of the village has always been Hungarian speaking. In the second half of the 20th century the portion of gypsy population gradually outgrew in number the rest.

A large part of population born after the World War II left the village and moved to towns and cities. Only few remained to work in agriculture. Currently, most of the population is either white and retired, or gypsy and unemployed.

Culture
The most important building (apart from the pub) is the church.

The village has a public library.

Economy
The village's economy has always been agricultural. With the rise of communism in the second half of the 20th century, individual farmers were more or less forcibly consolidated in a local collective farm (similar to Soviet kolchoz). The economic situation of the now private collective farm is uncertain.

Some agricultural activity is done by private farmers.

There is a small local shop with consumer credit activities and a small local pub, but the pub has been closed down recently, however, because of violence.

External links
https://web.archive.org/web/20080111223415/http://www.statistics.sk/mosmis/eng/run.html 

Villages and municipalities in Rožňava District